Nucla is a statutory town in Montrose County, Colorado, United States. The population was 585 as of the 2020 census, down from 711 in 2010. Its name comes from the town founders' intent that it serve as a "nucleus" for the surrounding farms and mines, although it has since come to be associated with the growth of uranium mining in the region.

Geography
Nucla is located in southwestern Montrose County at  (38.266775, -108.547146). It is at the northern terminus of Colorado State Highway 97, which leads south  to Naturita, the only other incorporated place in the area. The Uncompahgre Plateau rises to the northeast.

Demographics

As of the census of 2000, there were 734 people, 311 households, and 208 families residing in the town. The racial makeup of the town was 94.69% White, 1.09% Native American, 0.14% Asian, 0.54% from other races, and 3.54% from two or more races. Hispanic or Latino of any race were 3.68% of the population.

There were 311 households, out of which 31.8% had children under the age of 18 living with them, 49.8% were married couples living together, 11.3% had a female householder with no husband present, and 32.8% were non-families. 30.5% of all households were made up of individuals, and 14.8% had someone living alone who was 65 years of age or older. The average household size was 2.36 and the average family size was 2.91.

In the town, the population was spread out, with 28.6% under the age of 18, 6.5% from 18 to 24, 24.3% from 25 to 44, 27.9% from 45 to 64, and 12.7% who were 65 years of age or older. The median age was 39 years. For every 100 females, there were 93.7 males. For every 100 females age 18 and over, there were 89.9 males.

The median income for a household in the town was $28,466, and the median income for a family was $33,636. Males had a median income of $32,417 versus $21,726 for females. The per capita income for the town was $12,982. About 14.4% of families and 17.0% of the population were below the poverty line, including 23.4% of those under age 18 and 12.1% of those age 65 or over.

History

There are several prehistoric sites near Nucla on the Colorado State Register of Historic Properties:
 Cottonwood Cave is a large rock shelter inhabited by 270 BC and the earliest date at which corn was found in the state of Colorado.
 Tabeguache Cave is another prehistoric rock shelter.
 Tabeguache Pueblo is an example of an early, dispersed Ancient Pueblo settlement, inhabited about AD 1100 and later abandoned.

The town was established by socialists, who emphasized the sharing of things.  The name of the town comes from the word nucleus.

In 1990, residents of Nucla hosted the first Top Dog World Championship Prairie Dog Shoot competition which resulted in killing nearly 3,000 prairie dogs.

In May 2013, the Nucla Town Board passed an ordinance that required every non-exempted head of household in the town to own a firearm.

Notable people
 W. A. Draves (1912–1994), founder and an apostle of the Church of Christ with the Elijah Message, now headquartered in Independence, Missouri. Draves is believed by his church to have received ninety messages from John the Baptist, some of them while he lived in Nucla.
 Bill Symons, Canadian Football Hall of Famer

See also

Montrose, CO Micropolitan Statistical Area

References

External links
 Official website
 Nucla Naturita Area Chamber of Commerce
 Nucla Public Library

Towns in Montrose County, Colorado
Towns in Colorado